Luv is the ninth studio album by Japanese rock band Luna Sea, released on December 20, 2017. The album reached number 4 on both the Oricon Albums Chart and Billboard Japan.

Overview
At their May 5, 2017 concert at the Nippon Budokan, Luna Sea announced that a then untitled new album would be released within the year. Ryuichi also said that the theme of the album is "Love." The album cover was designed by graphic artist YOSHIROTTEN. The album's eighteen-date The Luv -World Left Behind- tour was set to begin with two concerts on January 27 and 28, 2018 at Mori no Hall 21 in Chiba, but these shows were rescheduled to May 23 and 24 due to Sugizo having the flu. Instead the tour began on February 3.

The opening track "Hold You Down" was originally composed by Inoran, who compared it to "Absorb" from A Will. Maki Ohguro provides backing vocals on "Chikaibumi", "The Luv" and "Black and Blue".

"Piece of a Broken Heart" and "So Sad" were originally composed by Ryuichi with arrangements by Sugizo. Ryuichi and Inoran's Tourbillon bandmate Hiroaki Hayama provides piano on "Piece of a Broken Heart" and "The Luv".

"Ride the Beat, Ride the Dream" is Luna Sea's first instrumental track, originally composed by Inoran. "Black and Blue" was temporarily titled  after the film No One Knows About Persian Cats which greatly inspired Sugizo.

The song "Limit" was released as a single over a year before Luv. A music video was also made for the opening track "Hold You Down" directed by Shuichi Tan, who last worked with the group on the video for 2000's "Love Song".

Release
Three limited editions of Luv were released. The normal limited edition came with a DVD of the music videos for "Limit" and "Hold You Down". An edition limited to members of the band's fan club, Slave, came with a live album of their May 29, 2017 concert and a DVD or Blu-ray of their September 24, 2016 concert in addition to a photobook and other goods. The third was only sold at their December 23 and 24, 2017 concerts at the Saitama Super Arena and included a live album recorded at that same venue the previous year on December 23 and 24, 2016.

Luv and the band's seven other major label studio albums released at the time were released on vinyl record for the first time on May 29, 2019.

Track listing

Personnel 
Luna Sea
Ryuichi – vocals
Sugizo – guitar, violin
Inoran – guitar
J – bass
Shinya – drums, percussion

Other
Daisuke "d-kiku" Kikuchi – sound effects and programming
Yumi Kawamura – female chorus on "Hold You Down", "Yamibi", "Thousand Years" and "Black and Blue"
Maki Ohguro – female chorus on "Chikaibumi", "The Luv" and "Black and Blue"
Hiroaki Hayama – acoustic piano and electric piano on "Piece of a Broken Heart" and "The Luv"
U-Key Zone – chorus arrangement on "Thousand Years"
Ikuro Fujiwara – strings arrangement and conductor on "Yamibi" and "Black and Blue"

References

External links 

Luna Sea albums
2017 albums